A footjob is a non-penetrative sexual practice with the feet that involves one's feet being rubbed on a partner in order to induce sexual excitement, stimulation or orgasm. In some cases it can be part of a foot fetish. Footjobs are most often performed on penises, with one partner using their feet or toes to stroke or rub the other partner's genital area. The term footjob may also refer to the practice of using one's feet or toes to caress a partner's breasts or vulva.

Popular culture

 On an episode of Desperate Housewives, Gabrielle Solis (Eva Longoria) seduces John Rowland (Jesse Metcalfe) by rubbing her feet against his crotch under a restaurant table.
 In the film The Beast (La Bête), Romilde de l'Esperance (played by Sirpa Lane) is chased by a werewolf-like creature, who receives sexual satisfaction from de l'Esperance by receiving a footjob from her (as well as other things) as she hangs on the branch of a tree.
In episode 8 of series 2 of the British drama Mile High, Eloise (Nichola Theobald) rubs her foot against Captain Nigel Croker's (Christopher Villiers) crotch to seduce him to give her money.

References

Further reading

Foot fetishism
Paraphilias
Sexual fetishism
Non-penetrative sex
Sexual acts